Dunhua railway station is a second-class railway station in Dunhua, Yanbian, Jilin. It was built in 1928.

It is on the Changchun–Tumen railway, Jilin–Hunchun intercity railway, and the Dunhua–Baihe high-speed railway, which is currently under construction.

References 

Railway stations in Yanbian
Railway stations in China opened in 1928